The 109th Pennsylvania House of Representatives District encompasses all of Columbia County.

Representatives

References

Government of Columbia County, Pennsylvania
109